The  is an electric multiple unit (EMU) train type operated by the private railway operator Keihan Electric Railway in Japan from 1971 until 2013.

History
Construction began in 1971 and resumed until 1973. Internally, the trains were fitted with color TVs. With the introduction of the Keihan 8000 series from 1989, the 3000 series trains were gradually replaced. A bi-level car was added to a 3000 series set in 1995. After the introduction of the new Keihan 3000 series in 2008, the old 3000 series was redesignated as 8000-30 series. The 3000 series was withdrawn from services by Keihan in March 2013.

Other operators

Toyama Chihō Railway
A bi-level car was transferred from Keihan to Toyama Chihō Railway in 2013.

Ōigawa Railway
Until 2014, Ōigawa Railway also operated a former Keihan 3000 series train.

Preserved examples
One car  is preserved at Kuzuha Mall.

References

External links

 Toyama Chihō Railway 
 Ōigawa Railway 3000 series information 

Electric multiple units of Japan
3000 series (1971)
Train-related introductions in 1971

Kawasaki multiple units
1500 V DC multiple units of Japan